Vice Admiral Anil Chopra, PVSM, AVSM is a retired Indian Navy Flag officer, who served as Flag Officer Commanding-in-Chief Western Naval Command from 2014 to 2015.

He previously served as Flag Officer Commanding-in-Chief Eastern Naval Command from 1 November 2011, after having served as Director General Indian Coast Guard from 2008.

Naval career
He joined the Indian Navy on July 1, 1975. and commanded the corvette INS Kuthar (1993–94), the destroyer INS Rajput (2000-2001) and the aircraft carrier, INS Viraat (2003-2004).

He was awarded the Ati Vishisht Seva Medal in 2007.

Awards and decorations

References

Indian Navy admirals
Directors General of the Indian Coast Guard
Flag Officers Commanding Western Fleet
Living people
Recipients of the Ati Vishisht Seva Medal
Year of birth missing (living people)
Recipients of the Param Vishisht Seva Medal